The 2022 General Tire Delivers 200 was the tenth stock car race of the 2022 ARCA Menards Series season, and the 37th iteration of the event. The race was held on Friday, July 22, 2022, in Long Pond, Pennsylvania at Pocono Raceway, a 2.5 mile (4.0 km) permanent triangular-shaped racetrack. The race was decreased from 80 laps to 64 laps, due to increasing darkness. Taylor Gray, driving for David Gilliland Racing, would win the race, after leading the race when the final caution came out with 16 laps to go, which was a spin from Jesse Love. Gray would also lead 38 laps. This was Gray's third career ARCA Menards Series, and his third of the season. To fill out the podium, Nick Sanchez, driving for Rev Racing, and Brandon Jones, driving for Joe Gibbs Racing, would finish 2nd and 3rd, respectively.

Background 
Pocono Raceway (formerly Pocono International Raceway), also known as The Tricky Triangle, is a superspeedway located in the Pocono Mountains in Long Pond, Pennsylvania. It is the site of three NASCAR national series races and an ARCA Menards Series event in July: a NASCAR Cup Series race with support events by the NASCAR Xfinity Series and NASCAR Camping World Truck Series. From 1971 to 1989, and from 2013 to 2019, the track also hosted an Indy Car race, currently sanctioned by the IndyCar Series. Additionally, from 1982 to 2021, it hosted two NASCAR Cup Series races, with the traditional first date being removed for 2022.

Pocono is one of the few NASCAR tracks not owned by either NASCAR or Speedway Motorsports, the dominant track owners in NASCAR. Pocono CEO Nick Igdalsky and president Ben May are members of the family-owned Mattco Inc, started by Joseph II and Rose Mattioli.  Mattco also owns South Boston Speedway in South Boston, Virginia.

Outside NASCAR and IndyCar Series races, Pocono is used throughout the year by the Stock Car Experience, Bertil Roos Driving School, Sports Car Club of America (SCCA) as well as many other clubs and organizations. The triangular track also has three separate infield sections of racetrack – the north course, east course and south course. Each of these infield sections use separate portions of the track or can be combined for longer and more technical course configurations. In total Pocono Raceway has offers 22 different road course configurations ranging from .5 miles to 3.65 miles in length. During regular non-race weekends, multiple clubs or driving schools can use the track simultaneously by running on different infield sections. All of the infield sections can also be run in either clockwise or counter clockwise direction which doubles the 22 course configuration to 44 total course options.

Entry list 

 (R) denotes rookie driver

Pre-race practice 
A pre-race practice session was held on Thursday, July 21, at 9:00 AM EST, and would last for five hours.

Practice 
The official 35-minute practice session was held on Friday, July 22, at 2:45 PM EST.

Qualifying 
Qualifying was scheduled to be held on Friday, July 22, at 3:30 PM EST. The qualifying system used is a multiple-car, multiple-lap system with only one round. Whoever sets the fastest time in the round wins the pole.

Qualifying was cancelled due to inclement weather. The startling lineup would be based on the times from practice. As a result, Sammy Smith, driving for Kyle Busch Motorsports, would earn the pole.

Race results

Standings after the race 

Drivers' Championship standings

Note: Only the first 10 positions are included for the driver standings.

References

External links 

2022 ARCA Menards Series
NASCAR races at Pocono Raceway
General Tire Delivers 200
2022 in sports in Pennsylvania